Marshfield is a town in Wood County, Wisconsin, United States. The population was 811 at the 2000 census. Marshfield is also the name of a neighboring city: Marshfield, Wisconsin

History
Marshfield township was established in 1875, taking its name from the city of Marshfield.

Geography
According to the United States Census Bureau, the town has a total area of 16.6 square miles (43.0 km2), of which, 16.6 square miles (43.0 km2) of it is land and 0.06% is water.

Demographics
As of the census of 2000, there were 811 people, 295 households, and 233 families residing in the town. The population density was 48.8 people per square mile (18.9/km2). There were 307 housing units at an average density of 18.5 per square mile (7.1/km2). The racial makeup of the town was 99.63% White, 0.12% African American, 0.00% from other races, and 0.25% from two or more races. Hispanic or Latino of any race were 0.49% of the population.

There were 295 households, out of which 36.3% had children under the age of 18 living with them, 71.5% were married couples living together, 5.1% had a female householder with no husband present, and 20.7% were non-families. 18.0% of all households were made up of individuals, and 5.8% had someone living alone who was 65 years of age or older. The average household size was 2.75 and the average family size was 3.15.

In the town, the population was spread out, with 26.1% under the age of 18, 7.8% from 18 to 24, 29.0% from 25 to 44, 25.6% from 45 to 64, and 11.5% who were 65 years of age or older. The median age was 38 years. For every 100 females, there were 106.4 males. For every 100 females age 18 and over, there were 101.0 males.

The median income for a household in the town was $46,750, and the median income for a family was $54,844. Males had a median income of $32,875 versus $25,568 for females. The per capita income for the town was $21,316.  3.3% of the population and 2.6% of families were below the poverty line. Out of the total people living in poverty, 3.4% are under the age of 18 and 6.9% are 65 or older.

References

External links
 1854 plat map of town of Marshfield
 1879 plat map
 1896 plat map
 1909 plat map
 1928 plat map
 1956 plat map

Towns in Wood County, Wisconsin
Towns in Wisconsin